The currency of Cyprus can refer to:
Euro in the republic of Cyprus
Cypriot Pound used until 2008
Turkish lira in Turkish controlled Northern Cyprus